Mereni is a commune in Constanța County, Northern Dobruja, Romania. The commune includes four villages:
 Mereni (historical name: Enghe-Mahale)
 Osmancea
 Ciobănița (historical names: Agemler)
 Miriștea (historical names: Edilchioi)

The former village of Lungeni (historical name: Uzunlar) was merged with the village of Mereni by the 1968 administrative reform.

Demographics
At the 2011 census, Mereni had 1,920 Romanians (90.14%), 28 Roma  (1.31%), 5 Turks (0.23%), 177 Tatars (8.31%).

References

Communes in Constanța County
Localities in Northern Dobruja